The Museum of Contemporary Art (often abbreviated to MSU) is a contemporary art museum located on Dubrovnik Avenue in Zagreb, Croatia. It is the biggest and most modern museum in the country.

History 
The museum traces its origins from the City Gallery of Contemporary Art which was established in 1954. The gallery was located at the Kulmer Palace in the Upper Town area and also housed the Center for Photography, Film and Television and a museum library. Due to lack of space the  original museum never had a permanent display.

Architecture 
In 1998, a decision was made to move the museum to a brand new building on the corner of Dubrovnik and Većeslav Holjevac avenues in Novi Zagreb district.

A competition for the building's design was held, and architect Igor Franić's design was chosen out of 85 entries submitted. The cornerstone for the new building was laid in November 2003, and the new museum finally opened on 11 December 2009, after six years of construction which was beset with several delays. Originally planned to cost around 200 million HRK, the cost eventually amounted to 450 million HRK (around 84 million US$), invested in equal parts by the Ministry of Culture and the City of Zagreb.

The present building has a total area of 14,600 m2, out of which 3,500 m2 is reserved for its permanent collection and around 1,500 m2 is designated for occasional exhibitions.

The building also houses a library, a multimedia hall, a bookstore, cafe and a restaurant.

Permanent Collection 
The museum houses a total of 12,000 objects (of which around 600 are on permanent display) and numerous works by contemporary Croatian artists, including Vojin Bakić, Boris Bućan, Tošo Dabac, Braco Dimitrijević, Tomislav Gotovac, Benko Horvat, Alexandar Battista Ilić, Sanja Iveković, Anto Jerković, Julije Knifer, Zlatko Kopljar, Ivan Kožarić, Vlado Kristl, Vlado Martek, Dalibor Martinis, Ivan Picelj, Vjenceslav Richter, Edita Schubert, Mladen Stilinović, Miroslav Šutej; as well as international contemporary artists such as Getulio Alviani, Alberto Biasi, Max Bill, Piero Dorazio, Julio Le Parc, Richard Mortensen, Otto Piene, Jesús Rafael Soto, Victor Vasarely, Marina Abramović, Dorothy Cross, Katarzyna Kozyra, etc.

The Test Site metal sculpture by Carsten Höller was installed in the entrance hall of the museum in time for the official opening, as were installations by Braco Dimitrijević and Mirosław Bałka (Eyes of Purification) in front of the building's south side entrance.

See also
Croatian Museum of Naïve Art
 Institute for Contemporary Art, Zagreb
Modern Gallery, Zagreb
The Strossmayer Gallery of Old Masters
List of museums in Croatia

References

External links

Official website
Brochure with basic information about the museum in English
Article about museum's history published in Vijenac 

Art museums and galleries in Zagreb
Contemporary art galleries in Europe
Novi Zagreb
1954 establishments in Croatia
Art museums established in 1954
Art museums established in 2009
Modernist architecture in Croatia